Patrick Clason (13 October 1789 – 30 July 1867) was a Scottish minister who served as Moderator of the General Assembly to the Free Church of Scotland in 1848/49.

Life
He was born on 13 October 1789 in the manse at Dalziel near the River Clyde, the youngest son of Rev Robert Clason. The family moved to Logie Kirk near Stirling in his youth. He studied divinity at the University of Glasgow then completed his studies at the University of Edinburgh and was licensed to preach by the Church of Scotland in 1811.

In 1815 Lady Stuart of Castlemilk presented him (as his patron) to the parish of Carmunnock.

In 1824 moved to Edinburgh as minister of St Cuthbert's Chapel of Ease, which was elevated to a quoad sacra parish church in 1834 and thereafter known as Buccleuch Parish Church. He lived nearby at 23 Buccleuch Place.

In 1827 his house was burgled by William Law, blacksmith in Edinburgh. Two table cloths were stolen. Law was sentenced to be transported to Australia for 14 years.

In 1830 he stood unsuccessfully for the chair in Divinity at the University of St Andrews. At the Disruption of 1843 Clason joined the Free Church of Scotland. He served as its Clerk (alongside Rev Thomas Pitciairn) for 23 years. The Free Church built a new church at Buccleuch south of the old parish church, on the corner of Buccleuch Place. This temporary structure was replaced in 1856 by the Buccleuch and Greyfriars Free Church, to the east on West Crosscauseway.

He succeeded Rev James Sievewright as Moderator in 1848 and was succeeded in turn in 1849 by Very Rev Mackintosh MacKay.

He died at home, 22 George Square on 30 July 1867. He is buried in the Grange Cemetery in south Edinburgh. The grave lies midway along the north wall and also contains several other family members.

Artistic recognition

He was photographed in 1860 (illustrated below) at the foot of the steps to New College with several other ex-Moderators of the Free Church.

Family

He was brother-in-law to the Very Rev Patrick MacFarlan Moderator of the Free Church in 1845/6.

His brother the Rev James Clason (1783-1852) was also a Free Church minister.

Gallery

References
Citations

Sources

 
 

1789 births
1867 deaths
19th-century Ministers of the Free Church of Scotland